"Najane Kyun" (literal English translation: "Don't Know Why?") is a song by Strings released on the 2004 soundtrack for the film Spider-Man 2. This track is on the Pakistani version of the soundtrack. The song is also featured on their fourth studio album, Dhaani, released in 2003.

Background
In June 2004, before they could record their next song, "Najane Kyun", Strings were approached by the heads at Columbia TriStar Films of India, a sister company to their record label company to include the song in the soundtrack of the Hindi version of the epic Hollywood blockbuster Spider-Man 2. With their massive presence in the Indian pop music scene, Strings were mistaken for an Indian band.

Soon afterwards, they were approached by an Indian director shooting Zinda, a remake of the classic South Korean film Oldboy to do a soundtrack. Maqsood composed a song titled "Zinda" for the movie. For the video, the duo had to act alongside two A-list actors from Bollywood. It was here that the duo became good friends with John Abraham and Sanjay Dutt and would later appear in more ventures together.

Track listing
Najane Kyun

References

External links
Strings Online - official website

Urdu-language songs
2004 singles
Strings (band) songs
Songs written for films
Spider-Man (2002 film series)
Songs from Spider-Man films